Ahmad Moshir al-Saltaneh ( ‎;July 6, 1844 in Amol– April 20, 1918 in Tehran), also known Moshir al-Saltaneh and Mirza Ahmad Khan Moshir al-Saltaneh was a Prime Minister of Qajar era Iran. He served as Prime Minister of Iran twice and served as minister of interior. He was also Iran's Justice minister.

References

1844 births
1918 deaths
Prime Ministers of Iran
Politics of Qajar Iran
People from Mazandaran Province
People from Amol
19th-century Iranian politicians
20th-century Iranian politicians
People of Qajar Iran
Burials at Fatima Masumeh Shrine